Sergio Bitar Chacra (born 30 December 1940) is a Chilean economist and politician who served as minister during the governments of Salvador Allende (1970−1973) and Michelle Bachelet (2006–2010).

References

1940 births
Living people
20th-century Chilean politicians
21st-century Chilean politicians
Chilean people
Christian Democratic Party (Chile) politicians
Harvard University alumni
Members of the Inter-American Dialogue
Party for Democracy (Chile) politicians
Socialist Party of Chile politicians
University of Chile alumni